Daniel Henry Moloney (9 April 1913 – 22 January 1975) was an Australian rules footballer who played with Hawthorn in the Victorian Football League (VFL).

Military service
Moloney later served in the Royal Australian Air Force during World War II.

Death
He died at East Brighton on 22 January 1975.

Notes

References

External links 

1913 births
1975 deaths
Australian rules footballers from Melbourne
Hawthorn Football Club players
People from Fitzroy, Victoria
Royal Australian Air Force personnel of World War II
Military personnel from Melbourne